Leo Dannin (26 March 1898 – 15 September 1971) was a Danish footballer. He competed in the men's tournament at the 1920 Summer Olympics.

References

External links
 

1898 births
1971 deaths
Danish men's footballers
Denmark international footballers
Olympic footballers of Denmark
Footballers at the 1920 Summer Olympics
Footballers from Copenhagen
Association football forwards
Kjøbenhavns Boldklub players